"Want Dem All"  is a song by Jamaican dancehall recording artist Sean Paul, featuring vocals from Konshens. The song was released as a digital download in the United States on 15 November 2013 through Atlantic Records as the fourth single from his sixth studio album Full Frequency (2014).

Chart performance

Release history

References

2013 songs
2013 singles
Sean Paul songs
Songs written by Sean Paul
Songs written by Kshmr
Songs written by Benny Blanco